Spinolia is a genus of cuckoo wasps belonging to the subfamily Chrysidinae. The name honours Maximilian Spinola.

Species
Species within this genus include:
 Spinolia dallatorreana
 Spinolia dournovi
 Spinolia hibera
 Spinolia lamprosoma
 Spinolia rogenhoferi
 Spinolia schmidti
 Spinolia unicolor

References 

Hymenoptera genera
Chrysidinae
Taxa named by Anders Gustaf Dahlbom